Teams in the Swiss National League A played 22 games in the 1998–99 football season, with an eight-team playoff.

Overview
The Qualification Round to the League season 2001–02 was contested by twelve teams. The first eight teams of the First Stage (or Qualification) were then to compete in the Championship Playoff Round. The teams in ninth to twelfth position completed with the top four teams of the Nationalliga B in a Nationalliga A/B Playoff round. At the end of the season Servette FC won the championship.

First stage

Table

Results

Second stage
The first eight teams of the regular season (or Qualification) competed in the Championship Playoff Round. They took half of the points (rounded up to complete units) gained in the Qualification as Bonus with them

Championship group

Table

Results

Promotion/relegation group
The teams in ninth to twelfth position in the Nationalliga A completed with the top four teams of the Nationalliga B in a Nationalliga A/B Playoff round (promotion/relegation).

Table

Results

Sources
 Switzerland 1998–99 at RSSSF

Swiss Football League seasons
Swiss
1998–99 in Swiss football